The Samsung Galaxy F04 is an Android-based smartphone designed and manufactured by Samsung Electronics. It was announced on January 4, 2023.

References

External links 
 

Samsung Galaxy
Android (operating system) devices
Mobile phones introduced in 2023
Mobile phones with multiple rear cameras
Samsung smartphones